Bathsheba, in the Hebrew Bible, was the wife of Uriah the Hittite and later of David.

Bathsheba may also refer to:

Arts and entertainment
Bathsheba (Memling), a  painting by Hans Memling
Bathsheba at her Bath (Veronese), a 1575 painting by Paolo Veronese
Bathsheba (Gérôme), an 1889 painting by Jean-Léon Gérôme
Bathsheba Everdene, a fictional character in the novel Far from the Madding Crowd by Thomas Hardy

Places
Bathsheba, Barbados, a village
Bathsheba, Oklahoma, a ghost town in Oklahoma, US

People
Bathsheba Bowers (1671–1718), American Quaker author and preacher
Bathsheba Nell Crocker (born 1968), American diplomat
Bathsheba Demuth, American environmental historian
Bathsheba Doran, British-born playwright living in New York City
Bathsheba Grossman (born 1966), American digital sculptor
Bathsheba Ratzkoff, film director, producer, and editor
Bathsheba W. Smith (1822–1910), early member of the Latter Day Saint movement
Bathsheba Spooner (1746–1778), the first woman executed in the United States after the Declaration of Independence

See also
Bethsabée, a 1947 French film
David and Bathsheba (disambiguation)